The Legends Tour is the current branding of the European Senior Tour, a professional tour for male golfers aged 50 and over, run by the PGA European Tour. The tour was branded as the Staysure Tour for the 2018 and 2019 seasons after UK-based insurance company Staysure became the first-ever title sponsors of the senior tour in December 2017. The tour was relaunched as the Legends Tour in 2020, after Ryan Howsam, founder and owner of Staysure, took majority ownership in a joint venture with the European Tour.

History
The Tour was founded in 1992 after calls from 60 leading professionals five years after the first Senior Open Championship in 1987. The highest profile event in Europe is the Senior British Open Championship, which is co-sanctioned by PGA Tour Champions and was played on the Old Course at St Andrews for the first time in 2018. The European Tour co-sanctions the Senior PGA Championship and the U.S. Senior Open. Prize money in the latter does not count towards the Order of Merit, but since 2007 the former has been an official money event.

Tour schedules
The table below summarises the development of the tour since 1999, which was the year that the euro became the currency of record for the tour. Individual tournaments have purses fixed in a mixture of British pounds, euros and U.S. dollars, so year on year changes in the total prize fund reflect exchange rate fluctuations as well as prize fund movements in constant currencies.

Order of Merit winners
The winner of the Order of Merit is awarded the John Jacobs Trophy.

Leading career money winners
The table below shows the top ten career money leaders on the European Senior Tour as of the end of the 2018 season.

There is a full list that is updated after each tournament on the European Tour's website here.

See also
List of golfers with most European Senior Tour wins

Notes

References

External links

European Senior Tour
Professional golf tours
Sports organizations established in 1992